Korovkin is a Russian masculine surname, its feminine counterpart is Korovkina. It may refer to
Michael Korovkin, Russian academic
Nelli Korovkina (born 1989), Russian football player
Nikita Korovkin (born 1983), Russian ice hockey defenceman 
Nikolai Korovkin (born 1974), Russian football player
Pavel Korovkin (1913–1985), Russian mathematician

Russian-language surnames